Aylmer John Eggert Liesemer (November 27, 1905 – January 4, 1995) was a Canadian politician and teacher.

Early life
Liesemer was born in Didsbury, Alberta in 1905. He received all of his early public grade school in Didsbury with the exception of 1 year in Calgary.

In 1921 and 1922, Liesemer attended Normal School in Calgary at what became the Administration
Building for the Southern Alberta Institute of Technology. He was one of the first class of graduates from that school.

Liesemer became a teacher and taught in Didsbury and Calgary. He started teaching High School students in 1930 through to his retirement in 1970. He was an instructor in history, geography and social studies at Crescent Heights High School in Calgary. He kept teaching while still performing his duties in the public offices he held.

Municipal politics

Liesemer served as an Alderman for the city of Calgary from 1934 to 1937. In 1937 he challenged Incumbent Mayor Andrew Davison but failed in his bid to defeat the mayor.

Provincial career
Aylmer Liesemer first ran as a Labor politician in the 1935 Alberta general election and was badly defeated finishing 15th out of 20 candidates.

Liesemer attempted to run for federal politics in the 1940 Canadian federal election in the Bow River electoral district. He ran as the Cooperative Commonwealth candidate finishing 4th out of 5 candidates losing to incumbent Charles Edward Johnston.
Liesemer would run again in the 1944 Alberta general election this time as a candidate for the provincial Cooperative Commonwealth he find electoral success winning the 5th spot in the Single Transferable Vote. Aylmer would be reelected to a second term in the 1948 Alberta general election and ultimately defeated after serving two terms in the 1952 Alberta general election.

He attempted to win his seat back running in Calgary North in the 1959 Alberta general election but was badly defeated by incumbent Rose Wilkinson from Social Credit. He died in Toronto in 1995 at the age of 89.

References

External links
City of Calgary, Aldermanic Galley Page 107
Legislative Assembly of Alberta membership list

1905 births
1995 deaths
Calgary city councillors
Alberta Co-operative Commonwealth Federation MLAs
People from Didsbury, Alberta